Greasy Creek is a stream in Madison County in the U.S. state of Missouri. It is a tributary of the Castor River.

Greasy Creek was named for the greasewood timber near its course, according to local history.

See also
List of rivers of Missouri

References

Rivers of Madison County, Missouri
Rivers of Missouri